Alexander Rae born 2 February 1986 in Coventry, England is a rugby union head coach for Coventry. He previously played for the Northampton Saints, Saracens, London Wasps and Bedford Blues.

Personal life
Rae was educated at Coundon Court in Coventry.

Club career
Rae started his rugby career playing at Northampton Saints after coming up through their academy. He made his debut in 2005. He signed a full-time contract with them in 2007, however he only made 12 appearances with 2 starts while at Northampton Saints. In 2009, he was loaned out to Nottingham R.F.C. and later in the year moved to Bedford Blues and was named as the vice-captain in the 2011–12 season, being named as captain when James Pritchard was playing at the 2011 Rugby World Cup. In 2012 he played for Saracens F.C. on dual registration with Bedford Blues. In 2013 he was loaned to English Premiership side London Wasps so that Rae could play top flight rugby. London Wasps also paid compensation to Bedford Blues for the loan. In August 2013, Rae left Bedford Blues and moved to Jersey R.F.C.. Upon signing, he was given the captaincy of Jersey for the 2013-14 RFU Championship season. In May 2014, it was announced that Jersey had retained Rae for the 2014-15 RFU Championship season.

International career
Rae has played for the England national rugby sevens team. He has also represented the England national under-18 rugby union team, the England national under-19 rugby union team and the England national under-20 rugby union team.

References

External links
Guinness Premiership profile

1986 births
Living people
Bedford Blues players
English rugby union players
Jersey Reds players
Northampton Saints players
Rugby union players from Coventry
Saracens F.C. players
Wasps RFC players
Rugby union locks